Leon Franklin Bogues (November 8, 1927 – August 6, 1985) was an American politician from New York.

Life
Bogues was born on November 8, 1927, in Harlem, the son of  Jamaican migrants Frank Millholand Bogues and Rosa Louise Bogues née McLaren. He attended Howard University, and graduated from Long Island University. Then he became a probation officer attached to the New York Supreme Court (1st D.). He married Dorothy, and they had two children.

He entered politics as a Democrat, and was appointed by Borough President Percy Sutton to the Manhattan Community Board No. 7. In 1978, he became the board's chairman.
 
On February 12, 1980, he was elected to the New York State Senate, to fill the vacancy caused by the appointment of Carl McCall to the U.S. Mission to the U.N. Bogues was re-elected three times, and remained in the State Senate until his death in 1985, sitting in the 183rd, 184th, 185th and 186th New York State Legislatures. His district comprised parts of Harlem and the Upper West Side.

He died on August 6, 1985, at his home on West 95th Street in Manhattan, of lung cancer.

Further reading
Paterson, David "Black, Blind, & In Charge: A Story of Visionary Leadership and Overcoming Adversity."Skyhorse Publishing. New York, New York, 2020

References

1927 births
1985 deaths
Howard University alumni
Long Island University alumni
Democratic Party New York (state) state senators
African-American state legislators in New York (state)
Deaths from lung cancer in New York (state)
20th-century American politicians
20th-century African-American politicians
African-American men in politics